To Live is a 2010 Russian drama film written, directed by Yuri Bykov. It is his debut film. It premiered at the Kinotavr Film Festival.

Plot
In the Russian countryside, Mikhail is hunting when he encounters Andrey, a criminal who is running from three men who are trying to kill him. They are compelled to try to escape together, first in Mikhail's car, then on foot, while tension builds between them.

Cast
Vladislav Toldykov as Mikhail
Denis Shvedov as Andrey
Sergei Belyayev as fisherman
Aleksei Komashko as Sergey
Sergey Sosnovsky as old man
Konstantin Strelnikov as Oleg
Sergey Zharkov as Ivan

Reception
Variety described the film as "[a]n impressively confident feature debut", while noting that it had been the subject of controversy due to the "onscreen death of an animal" (although the film's credits state that no animal was actually harmed).

Awards and nominations
First feature film Prize in International Human Rights Film Festival, 2010

References

External links
 

2010 directorial debut films
2010 films
2010 action drama films
Russian action drama films
Russian drama road movies
2010s Russian-language films
Films directed by Yuri Bykov